Scopula plumbearia is a moth of the  family Geometridae. It is found in Japan.

The wingspan is 19–21 mm.

References

Moths described in 1891
plumbearia
Moths of Japan